Theophanes Karykes (? – 26 March 1597) was Ecumenical Patriarch of Constantinople (as Theophanes I) from August 1596 to February 1597. He died only three weeks after leaving office. He was previously the metropolitan of Philippopolis, a protopsaltes and composer of hymns.

Bibliography 
 Venance Grumel, Traité d'études byzantines, vol. I : La chronologie, Presses universitaires de France, Paris, 1958, p. 438.
 Nicolas Viton de Saint-Allais, L'art de vérifier les dates, tome I, Paris, 1818, p. 494.

1597 deaths
16th-century Ecumenical Patriarchs of Constantinople
Metropolitans of Plovdiv